James Phillip Henry Hayes (born 27 June 2001) is an English cricketer who plays for Nottinghamshire County Cricket Club. He is a right-handed batsman and a right arm medium-fast pace bowler.

Career
Hayes attended Whitgift School and King’s College, Taunton. He was in the squad at Somerset until he was waylaid by a back injury. He joined the Darren Lehmann Cricket Academy in Adelaide in the winter of 2020 where he was coached by former Australian test bowler Shaun Tait. He returned to England in March 2020 two days before the country went into lockdown because of the COVID-19 pandemic which severely truncated the cricket season. The following year, after a successful trial, Hayes was brought in to play Second  XI cricket with Notts in 2021. On 23 June 2021,  Hayes was given a professional contract with Notts until the end of the 2022 summer.

Hayes made his List A debut for Notts on 12 August 2022, against Middlesex at Grantham. He took 2/58, the best bowling figures for Notts on the day.

References

External links

2001 births
English cricketers
Nottinghamshire cricketers
Living people
People educated at Whitgift School
People educated at King's College, Taunton